Mercy Health may refer to:

Health care providers 
 Mercyhealth, serving Wisconsin and Illinois
 Mercy Health (Michigan), serving West Michigan
 Mercy Health (Ohio and Kentucky), based in Cincinnati, Ohio
 MercyOne (formerly Mercy Health Network), serving Iowa
 Mercy Health System, based in southeastern Pennsylvania, merged into Trinity Health Mid-Atlantic
 Mercy (healthcare organization), serving the St. Louis, Missouri area

See also 
 Mercy Health Plans, a Missouri-based insurer acquired by Coventry Health Care in 2010
 Atrium Health Mercy, a hospital in Charlotte, North Carolina
 Saint Joseph Mercy Health System, a health care provider in southeast Michigan
 Mercy College of Health Sciences, Des Moines, Iowa